Marriage in Cyprus is allowed for both Cyprus citizens and foreigners. It may be performed by civil or religious authorities. Around 20,000 Israelis marry in Cyprus annually, many of them seeking to avoid restrictions on marriage in Israel.

References

External links

Cyprus
Cyprus
Cyprus
Demographics of Cyprus